"Take a Message to Mary" is a song released in 1959 by The Everly Brothers. The song spent 13 weeks on the Billboard Hot 100 chart, peaking at No. 16, while reaching No. 8 on Canada's CHUM Hit Parade, and No. 20 on the United Kingdom's New Musical Express chart.

Background
In the lyrics of the song, a man is thrown in jail for committing a crime, and not wanting to experience suffering, he asks a friend of his to deliver a message to his sweetheart, Mary, and tell her that he has gone to see the world, has to cancel their wedding day, and encourages her to find someone new. The song ends with a lament from the imprisoned man that his "cell is cold", implying that because of his crime, he loses what he cherishes the most.

Chart performance

Cover versions
Nick Lowe and Dave Edmunds released a version of the song on their 1980 EP, Nick Lowe & Dave Edmunds Sing The Everly Brothers.
Bob Dylan released a version of the song in 1970 on his album Self Portrait

References

1958 songs
1959 singles
Songs written by Felice and Boudleaux Bryant
The Everly Brothers songs
Nick Lowe songs
Dave Edmunds songs
Cadence Records singles
Songs about prison